The 2008–09 First League of the Federation of Bosnia and Herzegovina season was the ninth since its establishment.

Clubs and stadiums

League standings

External links
http://www.bihsoccer.com/?s=plfbih_tabela

First League of the Federation of Bosnia and Herzegovina seasons
2
Bos